Graham Farmer Freeway is a  inner-city freeway in Perth, Western Australia. It links Rivervale and Burswood with West Perth and Leederville, providing an east-west bypass of Perth's central business district.

The freeway, in conjunction with Great Eastern Highway and Orrong Road, is also an important connection between the city centre and Perth Airport. It is allocated State Route 8, and was named in honour of the Australian rules footballer, Graham "Polly" Farmer, who played between 1953 and 1971 in both the West Australian and Victorian Football Leagues.

Route description

Western terminus
The freeway's western terminus is a hybrid interchange, combining a Full Y interchange with the Mitchell Freeway, an exit to James Street, and an entrance ramp from and exit ramp to Loftus Street. The interchange also incorporates a partial Y interchange that connects Charles Street to the Mitchell Freeway. This is known as the Hamilton Interchange.

Northbridge Tunnel
Immediately east of the interchange is the Northbridge Tunnel, Western Australia's only freeway tunnel. The  tunnel has three traffic lanes in each direction, with an escape passageway between the carriageways. The tunnel is colloquially known as the "Polly Pipe", a reference not only to the freeway's namesake, but also to the colloquialism "Poly Pipe" in reference to plastic pipes (commonly made from polyethylene or polyvinyl chloride materials) used in reticulation and plumbing. Both tunnel portals feature public art installations. At the western end, there is a pictorial history of Northbridge, and at the eastern end, the Aboriginal artist Ron Corbett created images based on indigenous artwork. The transportation of dangerous goods and explosives through the freeway tunnel is prohibited.

Perth City exits
At the eastern end of the tunnel is the diamond interchange with East Parade, which connects the freeway to East Perth. The East Parade exit ramps allow traffic movements to the opposite entrance ramp, as the westbound entrance ramp also connects to Lord Street, whilst the eastbound exit ramp merges with a ramp from Lord Street. This allows a connection between the city centre and the freeway, via Lord Street.

Windan Bridge
The bridge is one of the more recent constructions of the 19 bridges that cross the river. It includes pedestrian and cycling access.

Burswood
Graham Farmer Freeway continues into Burswood as a six lane freeway. There is a diamond interchange with Victoria Park Drive for access to the adjacent Belmont Park Racecourse, and the nearby Optus Stadium and Crown Perth complex. The eastern terminus is a modified diamond interchange with Great Eastern Highway, that includes a looped ramp for the south-westbound to north-eastbound traffic movement. The freeway continues south-east as Orrong Road, an arterial road that is also part of State Route 8.

History
Graham Farmer Freeway was constructed between 1996 and 2000, and used over 180,000 cubic metres of concrete. The project finished three months early and within budget, costing $313 million. It has been designed to have a 150-year lifespan, following the Main Roads Western Australia specification.

Stage 1 involved construction of the tunnel and was undertaken by a Clough/Baulderstone Hornibrook joint venture, was a finalist for the 2001 Australian Construction Achievement Award.

Stage 2 included the Windan Bridge, and nine other traffic and pedestrian bridge structures. This stage won an award from Austroads, the Association of Australian and New Zealand Road Transport and Traffic Authorities.

2013 tunnel expansion
During several weekend closures in April 2013, the existing breakdown shoulders were removed to accommodate an extra lane of traffic in each direction, without modifying the tunnel's structure. The removal of the breakdown lanes was criticised by the state Opposition, and the RAC raised concerns about emergency response times. As part of the upgrade, Main Roads Western Australia implemented an incident response plan, including a dedicated towing service, and the fire control and ventilation systems were upgraded. The new eastbound lane opened on 16 April, a day after it was originally scheduled to open, due to delays in commissioning the new lane use management system. The third westbound lane opened on 29 April, as scheduled. The works were designed to improve the traffic flow in the Perth CBD, which was affected by construction projects such as the development of Elizabeth Quay.

Exits and interchanges

See also

 Freeways in Australia
 Freeways in Western Australia

Notes and references

Highways and freeways in Perth, Western Australia
Tunnels in Western Australia
Tunnels completed in 2000
Articles containing video clips
Road tunnels in Australia